Antonino Fogliani (born in Messina, June 29, 1976) is an Italian conductor.

Biography

He then furthered his musical training at the Accademia Musicale Chigiana in Siena where he studied conducting with Gianluigi Gelmetti and composition with Franco Donatoni and Ennio Morricone.

Fogliani's debut at the Rossini Opera Festival in Pesaro in 2001 with Il viaggio a Reims was the beginning of an international career. He went on to conduct productions such as Gaetano Donizetti's Ugo conte di Parigi and Maria Stuarda at La Scala in Milan,  Pietro Mascagni's Amica and  Rossini's Mosè in Egitto at the Rome Opera, Lucia di Lammermoor in St. Gallen, Verdi's Oberto conte di San Bonifacio  in the Verona Philharmonic Theatre, Il barbiere di Siviglia at La Fenice in Venice, and Bellini's La sonnambula at the Teatro Calderón (Valladolid). In 2005 at the Teatro San Carlo in Naples he conducted Paisiello's  in the new version by Roberto De Simone; the work was reprised in the 2006/07 season at La Scala in Milan.

Fogliani made his American debut in 2011 conducting Lucia di Lammermoor at the Houston Grand Opera. In 2012 he debuted Aida at the Teatro Regio in Parma adding to the Verdi repertoire which he had previously conducted—Rigoletto, Giovanna d'Arco, La battaglia di Legnano, La traviata, I masnadieri, and I Lombardi alla prima crociata.

He has conducted and recorded several titles in the Rossini repertoire (Otello, Il signor Bruschino, La scala di seta, L'occasione fa il ladro, Edipo Coloneo, Ciro in Babilonia,  La Cenerentola, Il turco in Italia, Semiramide, Adina) as well as some of the first performances in modern times of Mercadante's Don Chisciotte alle nozze di Gamaccio and I briganti and Vaccaj's La sposa di Messina at the Rossini in Wildbad festival, where he has been the Music Director since 2011. For the 2011 festival, he orchestrated the seven numbers composed  by Giovanni Tadolini in 1833  for  Rossini's Stabat Mater  (the orchestral version of which was lost) and conducted them in their first performance at Rossini in Wildbad.

In the symphonic repertoire he has performed with many orchestras including the National Orchestra of Santa Cecilia and the Rome Opera, the Orchestra del Teatro Comunale di Bologna, the Orchestra of the Teatro San Carlo in Naples, the Orchestra Sinfonica Toscanini Foundation of Parma, the Regional Orchestra Tuscany in Florence, the Philharmonic Orchestra of the Teatro Massimo Bellini of Catania, the Orchestra of Teatro alla Scala, I Pomeriggi Musicali in Milan, the Spanish orchestras of La Coruna, Tenerife and Castilla y Leon, the Orchestra of the Teatro Municipal in Santiago (Chile), the Sydney Symphony Orchestra, the Ensemble Orchestral de Paris, Orchestre de Bretagne and the Württembergische Philharmonie Reutlingen.

Fogliani has recorded for Naxos, Dynamic, Arthaus Musik, and Bongiovanni.

Since 2021 Fogliani has taught orchestral conducting at the Conservatory A. Scarlatti in Palermo. He lives in Lugano.

Opera repertoire

 Vincenzo Bellini: Bianca e Fernando, I Capuleti e i Montecchi, Norma, La Sonnambula, Il Pirata
 Georges Bizet: Carmen
 Francesco Cilea: Adriana Lecouvreur
 Domenico Cimarosa: Il marito disperato
 Gaetano Donizetti: Anna Bolena, Don Pasquale, Il diluvio universale, L'elisir d'amore, La Fille du régiment, Lucia di Lammermoor, Maria di Rohan, Maria Stuarda, Rita, Roberto Devereux, Ugo conte di Parigi
 Charles Gounod: Faust
 Franz Lehàr: La vedova allegra, Il paese del sorriso
 Ruggero Leoncavallo: I Pagliacci
 Pietro Mascagni: Amica, Cavalleria rusticana, L'amico Fritz
 Jules Massenet: Don Quichotte
 Saverio Mercadante: Don Chisciotte alle nozze di Gamaccio, I Briganti
 Francesco Morlacchi: Tebaldo e Isolina
 Wolfgang Amadeus Mozart: Le nozze di Figaro, Don Giovanni, Così fan tutte, Die Zauberflöte
 Giovanni Paisiello: Socrate immaginario
 Stefano Pavesi: Il trionfo delle belle
 Francis Poulenc: La Voix Humaine
 Giacomo Puccini: Gianni Schicchi, La Bohème, Madama Butterfly, Tosca, Turandot
 Gioachino Rossini: Adina, Bianca e Falliero, Il signor Bruschino, La Cenerentola, Il viaggio a Reims, Le comte Ory, Ciro in Babilonia, Il turco in Italia, La cambiale di matrimonio, L’occasione fa il ladro, L'inganno felice, Maometto secondo, Mosè in Egitto, La scala di seta, Il barbiere di Siviglia, Otello, Edipo Coloneo, L’italiana in Algeri, Sigismondo, Semiramide, Guillaume Tell, Stabat Mater
 Camille Saint-Saëns: Samson et Dalila
 Richard Strauss: Ariadne auf Naxos
 Nicola Vaccaj: La sposa di Messina
 Giuseppe Verdi: Aida, Attila, Giovanna d'Arco, I Lombardi alla prima crociata, I Masnadieri, Il trovatore, Macbeth, Nabucco, La battaglia di Legnano, La Traviata, Oberto conte di San Bonifacio, Otello, Rigoletto
 Richard Wagner: Der fliegende Holländer

Bibliography

Various authors, Gaetano Donizetti. Maria Stuarda / Antonino Fogliani. Teatro alla Scala. Mondadori Electa, 2009. .

Discography

G. Donizetti, Ugo conte di Parigi, CD Dynamic (2004)
G. Rossini, Ciro in Babilonia, CD Naxos (2005)
D. Cimarosa, Il marito disperato, CD Bongiovanni (2006)
G. Rossini, Mosè in Egitto, CD Naxos (2007)
G. Donizetti, Maria Stuarda, CD/DVD Musicom/Rai Trade (2008))
G. Rossini,Otello, CD Naxos (2010)
G. Donizetti, Lucia di Lammermoor, CD Naxos (2011)
N. Vaccaj, La sposa di Messina, CD Naxos (2012)
S. Mercadante, Don Chisciotte alle nozze di Gamaccio, CD Naxos (2012)
G. Rossini, L'occasione fa il ladro, CD Naxos (2012)
 G. Rossini, Semiramide, CD Naxos (2013)
 BEL CANTO BULLY - The musical legacy of the legendary opera impresario Domenico Barbaja, CD Naxos (2013)
 G. Verdi, Aida, CD C Major (2014)
 S. Mercadante, I Briganti, CD Naxos (2014)
 G. Rossini, Guillaume Tell, CD Naxos (2015)
 G. Rossini, Il viaggio a Reims, CD Naxos (2016)
 G. Rossini, Stabat Mater, CD Naxos (2016)
 G. Rossini, Sigismondo, CD Naxos (2017)
 V. Bellini, Bianca e Gernando, CD Naxos (2017)
 G. Rossini, Bianca e Falliero, CD Naxos (2017)
 G. Rossini, Maometto II, CD Naxos (2018)
 G. Rossini, Il barbiere di Siviglia, CD Dynamic (2020)
 F. Morlacchi, Tebaldo e Isolina, CD Naxos (2020)
 M. Taralli, Cantus Bononiæ Missa Sancti Petronii, CD Tactus (2022)

Filmography

G. Donizetti, Lucia di Lammermoor, DVD Dynamic (2006)
G. Donizetti, Maria Stuarda, DVD ARTHAUS MUSIK (2009)
G. Rossini, Il barbiere di Siviglia, DVD Dynamic (2009)
G. Verdi, Aida, DVD/Blu-ray UNITEL (2012)
 G. Rossini, Guillaume Tell, DVD Bongiovanni (2015)
 G. Rossini, L'inganno felice, DVD Dynamic (2016)

References

External links
Antonino Fogliani Official Website
 Antonino Fogliani on iTunes
 Biography on Naxos Classical Music

1976 births
Musicians from Messina
Musicians from Bologna
Italian male conductors (music)
Living people
21st-century Italian conductors (music)
21st-century Italian male musicians